Tigertail is a family of dragonflies.

Tigertail may also refer to:

 Common Tigertail, a species of dragonfly
 Tigertail (book), a book by Emma Trelles
 Tigertail (film), a 2020 film

Fictional characters
 Josie Tigertail
 Sammy Tigertail

See also

 Tigertails
 Tigertailz
 The Tiger's Tail